Luis Fernando Espindola (born June 28, 1975) is a Uruguayan former football defender  currently the head of sports at Alianza F.C.
Espindola has played for Fénix and Rentistas in the Primera División.

References

Association football defenders
1975 births
Living people
Club Nacional de Football players
Centro Atlético Fénix players
Cerro Porteño players
Uruguayan footballers
Club Blooming players
Alianza F.C. footballers
San Salvador F.C. footballers
Nejapa footballers
Once Municipal footballers
Expatriate footballers in Bolivia
Expatriate footballers in Paraguay
Expatriate footballers in El Salvador
Club Atlético Fénix players